Neomastix is a genus of true weevils in the family of beetles known as Curculionidae. There is at least one described species in Neomastix, N. solidaginis.

References

Further reading

 
 
 
 

Curculioninae
Articles created by Qbugbot